This is a list of people from Marin County, California, people born in, raised in, or strongly associated with the county.

 Josh Akognon, basketball player
 Juan Alderete de la Peña, Grammy-winning bassist
 Isabel Allende, writer
 Sam Andrew, musician
 Dave Archer (painter), artist
 Eve Arden (Eunice Quedens), Tamalpais High School, Class of 1926, actress (Our Miss Brooks, Grease)
 Tom Barbash, author	
 Arj Barker, comedian
 John Battelle, CEO of Federated Media, founder of Wired magazine, and author of The Search
 Melba Beals, civil rights activist	
 Michael Bloomfield, blues guitarist
 Barbara Boxer, former United States Senator
 Terry Bozzio, musician
 Fairuza Balk, actress, born in Point Reyes Station
 Jesse Barish, musician
 Richard Brautigan, author
 Joe Breeze, Tamalpais High School, Class of 1972, mountain bike pioneer and industry leader
 Laurel Burch, artist
 Merritt Butrick, Tamalpais High School, Class of 1977, actor (Square Pegs; James T. Kirk's son, David Marcus, in Star Trek)
 Yvonne Cagle, Novato High School, Class of 1977, M.D., NASA Astronaut
 Gunnar Carlsson, Redwood High School, Class of 1969, Swindells Professor of Mathematics Stanford University
 Pete Carroll, Redwood High School, Class of 1969, head football coach of the Seahawks
 Edwin Catmull, President of the Disney–Pixar Studios
 Bill Champlin, Tamalpais High School, Class of 1965, musician, Sons of Champlin, Chicago
 Chris Chaney, Tamalpais High School, Class of 1988, musician, Jane's Addiction, The Panic Channel
 Brenda Chapman, animation director
 Sam Chapman, Tamalpais High School, Class of 1934, athlete (high school and college all star, California Golden Bears; MLB)
 Craig Chaquico, guitarist from Jefferson Starship
 Maxine Chernoff, author
 Julia Child, Katherine Branson School, Class of 1930; host of The French Chef
 John Cipollina, Tamalpais High School, Class of 1964, lead guitarist for Quicksilver Messenger Service
 Signy Coleman, Tamalpais High School, Class of 1978, model, actress 
 Elmer Collett, Tamalpais High School, Class of 1962, lineman, NFL
 Jack Conte, musician, Pomplamoose
 Peter Coyote, actor
 Les Crane, radio announcer and talk show host
 David Crosby, musician
 Martin Cruz Smith, author
 Charlie Cunningham, Tamalpais High School, Class of 1967, mountain bike pioneer (Mountain Bike Hall of Fame)
Jake Curhan (born 1998), American football offensive tackle for the Seattle Seahawks of the National Football League (NFL)
 Ram Dass, author of Be Here Now
 Nataly Dawn, singer, Pomplamoose
 Joe DeMaestri, Tamalpais High School, Class of 1946, MLB shortstop
 Philip K. Dick, science fiction author, lived in Point Reyes Station 1958–1963 and in San Rafael and Santa Venetia through 1972
 Mike Dirnt, bass player, Green Day  
 Allen Drury, novelist, 1960 Pulitzer Prize winner, author of Advise and Consent
 George Duke, Tamalpais High School, Class of 1963, jazz pianist
 David Dukes, actor, Redwood High School
 Louis Durra, jazz pianist
 Clint Eastwood, actor and director
 Dave Eggers, author
 Daniel Ellsberg, whistle blower, writer and anti-war activist
 Mike "SuperJew" Epstein, Major League Baseball player
 Joe Eszterhas, screenwriter
 Cerridwen Fallingstar, historical novelist and Wiccan priestess
 Mimi Farina, musician, singer, non-profit director and sister of Joan Baez and widow of Richard Farina
 Jake Farrow, actor and writer
 David Fincher, film director
 Jack Finney, author, The Body Snatchers, Time and Again
 Gary Fisher, mountain biking pioneer
 Jon Fisher, entrepreneur
 Ken Flax, Olympic athlete, hammer throw
 Tyler Florence, celebrity chef
 Phil Frank, cartoonist
 David Freiberg, musician
 Jerry Garcia, musician, of The Grateful Dead
 Leonard Gardner, novelist, author of Fat City
 Adriana Giramonti, chef
 Jared Goff, Marin Catholic High School, Class of 2013, quarterback, NFL
 Bill Graham, promoter and founder of the Fillmore West in San Francisco
 David Grisman, mandolinist and composer
 Pete Gross, broadcaster for Seattle Seahawks
 Gary Gruber, physicist, educator, and author, Gruber's Complete Guide series for standardized test preparation
 Sammy Hagar, singer
 Anna Halprin, choreographer
 Oren Harari, business professor at University of San Francisco, author, speaker
 David Haskell, Terra Linda High School, Class of 1966, actor
 Annette Haven, ex-porn star
 S. I. Hayakawa, semanticist,  president of San Francisco State University, US Senator (1977–1983)
 Sterling Hayden, actor
 Matt Hazeltine, Tamalpais High School, Class of 1951, linebacker, NFL
 Mariel Hemingway, actress, born in Mill Valley
 Jon Hendricks, jazz lyricist, singer
 George Herms, Beat Artist, museum director
 James Hetfield, Metallica lead singer, rhythm guitar
 J. R. Hildebrand, auto racing driver
 George Hill, four-time national pairs figure skating champion
 Lester Holt, NBC News anchor
 Tess Uriza Holthe, author
 Tony Hsieh, CEO of Zappos.com
 Zakir Hussain, musician, San Anselmo
 Sam Vogel Jauz, American DJ/Music Producer
 Maz Jobrani, comedian and actor
 Booker T. Jones, musician
 Janis Joplin, singer; her last known residence was in Larkspur, California
 Isabelle Keith, actress
 Charlie Kelly, Tamalpais High School, Class of 1963, roadie (Sons of Champlin); Mountain Bike Hall of Fame
 Ali Akbar Khan, musician, Ali Akbar Khan College of Music
 Lisa Kindred, blues and folk singer and guitarist
 Klaus Kinski, actor (died in the Marin County town of Lagunitas)
 Harmony Korine, film director, (born in Bolinas)
 Walter Egel Kuhlman, abstract expressionist artist
 Jef Labes, keyboardist 
 Travis LaBoy, Marin Catholic High School, Class of 1999, linebacker, NFL
 Anne Lamott, writer
 Jim Lange, TV game show host (The Dating Game)
 John Lasseter, film director and Disney executive
 Anton Szandor LaVey (Howard Stanton Levey), Tamalpais High School, Class of ~1947, founder of Church of Satan
 Ralph Lazar, artist
 Bill Lee, Terra Linda High School, Class of 1964, MLB pitcher
 John Leslie Nuzzo, pornographic actor and director
 Barry Levinson, film director
 Jane Levy, actress (Suburgatory)
 Huey Lewis, singer
 Kevin Lima, film director
 Tim Lincecum, baseball player
 John Walker Lindh, American who fought for the Taliban
 Mary Tuthill Lindheim, sculptor, studio potter, and a planner of the Sausalito Art Fair
 Sacheen Littlefeather, political activist
 Sondra Locke, actress and director
 Ki Longfellow (born Pamela Longfellow), Redwood High School in Larkspur, CA; author of The Secret Magdalene, Flow Down Like Silver, Hypatia of Alexandria
 George Lucas, film director, founder of Lucasfilm and Industrial Light & Magic. Creator of Star Wars and "Indiana Jones" franchises.  Owner of "Skywalker Ranch"
 Andy Luckey, Redwood High School, Class of 1983, television producer, author, illustrator
 Ray Lynch, composer and mathematician
 Seán Mac Falls, poet
 Peter Magadini, drummer, composer
 Duster Mails, MLB pitcher; appeared in 1920 World Series
 Zekial Marko, pulp fiction writer, film & television series writer 
 Brian Maxwell, marathon runner and, with his wife to be, Jennifer Biddulph, developer and founder of Powerbar 
 Joyce Maynard, author
 Montgomery McFate, anthropologist, chief social scientist for Human Terrain System
 Terry McGovern, actor, voice, radio, Director of Marin Actors' Workshop
 Ron "Pigpen" McKernan, musician, of The Grateful Dead
 Bridgit Mendler, actress
 Tom Merritt, technology journalist and broadcaster
 Artie Mitchell, pornographic film producer
 Van Morrison, singer and songwriter
 Jonny Moseley, gold medal-winning Olympic skier
 Maria Muldaur, singer-songwriter, "Midnight at the Oasis"
 Walter Murch, film editor
 Gavin Newsom, former mayor of San Francisco, current Governor of California
 Connie Nielsen, actress
 Eric Norstad, ceramicist and architect
 Don Novello, actor and writer
 Phil Ochs, singer, songwriter
 Arthur Okamura, screen print artist  illustrator
 Karl Olson, Tamalpais High School, MLB outfielder
 George Demont Otis, artist
 William L. Patterson, Tamalpais High School, Class of 1911, attorney; civil rights pioneer
 Pat Paulsen, Tamalpais High School, Class of 1945, statesman; comic, The Smothers Brothers Comedy Hour
 Sean Penn, actor, activist
 Jacquie Phelan, mountain biking pioneer and racing champion; now freelance cycle skills trainer and writer
 Kathleen Quinlan, Tamalpais High School, Class of 1972, actress (American Graffiti, Apollo 13, Oliver Stone's The Doors)
 Bill Rafferty, former game show host, comedian
 Bonnie Raitt, singer
 Reminisce, street artist, sculptor
 Marc Reisner, environmentalist, author
 Howard Rheingold, author
 Meghan Rienks, actress
 Hal Riney, advertising executive
 Jason Roberts, author
 Pernell Roberts, actor, civil rights activist
 Chris Robinson (singer), singer, "The Black Crowes",
 Brande Roderick, model and actress
 Prince Andrew Romanov, Russian royal and artist
 Dennis B. Ross, U.S. diplomat and author
 George H. Ruge, San Francisco radio pioneer
 Kay Ryan, United States Poet Laureate
 Dana Sabraw, U.S. District Judge
 Mort Sahl, comedian
 Carlos Santana, musician
 Aram Saroyan, poet
 Strawberry Saroyan, novelist
 Michael Savage, conservative radio host
 Eric P. Schmitt, journalist, Pulitzer Prize winner
 Charles R. Schwab, investor
 Erik Scott, award-winning bass player, musician, writer, producer
 Vic Seixas (born 1923), Hall of Fame top-10 tennis player
 Tupac Shakur, Tamalpais High School, rapper, poet, and actor
 Peter Shor, Tamalpais High School, mathematician, MIT; MacArthur Fellow
 Grace Slick, musician, Jefferson Airplane, Jefferson Starship
 Gary Snyder, poet
 Tom Snyder, television talk host
 Myron Spaulding, boat designer and builder, sailboat racer and concert violinist
 John Stewart, musician, songwriter, Kingston Trio
 David Strathairn, Redwood High School, actor
 Nicholas Suntzeff, Redwood High School, cosmologist, Texas A&M, Gruber Prize in Cosmology
 Lisa Swerling, artist
 Amy Tan, author
 Gage Taylor, visionary artist
 Dina Temple-Raston, journalist for National Public Radio, author
 Twinka Thiebaud, writer and model
 Bill Thompson, Manager of Jefferson Airplane
 Courtney Thorne-Smith, Tamalpais High School, Class of 1985, actress (Melrose Place, Ally McBeal, According to Jim)
 Scott Thunes, musician
 Peter Tork, musician, member of The Monkees
 Lars Ulrich, Metallica drummer
 Lee Unkrich, employee at Pixar and director of Toy Story 3
 Jean Varda, artist
 Max Venable, baseball player for the San Francisco Giants
 Will Venable, baseball player for the San Diego Padres
 Winston Venable, football player for the Chicago Bears
 Vendela Vida, author
 John L. Wasserman, San Francisco Chronicle entertainment critic
 Alan Watts, writer
 Cassandra Webb (Cassandra Politzer), Tamalpais High School, Class of 1976, actress (Starship, Sons and Daughters)
Bob Weir, vocalist, rhythm guitarist, and founding member of Grateful Dead
 Lou Welch, poet
 Brett Wickens, designer
 Archie Williams, 1936 Summer Olympics 400m winner
 Robin Williams, actor, Flubber, Mrs. Doubtfire, Redwood High School graduate
 Tony Williams, drummer
 Cintra Wilson, Tamalpais High School, writer
 Robin Wright, actress
 Jesse Colin Young, singer-songwriter of 1970s and 80s, "Song for Julia"
 Saul Zaentz, film producer
 Barry Zito, baseball player

References

Marin
Marin County